Adolphus Joseph Lockhart (April 15, 1898 – June 25, 1986) was an American Negro league third baseman in the 1920s.

A native of Thomasville, Georgia, Lockhart attended Howard University and Morris Brown College. He played for the Wilmington Potomacs in 1925. Lockhart died in Atlanta, Georgia in 1986 at the age of 88.

References

External links
 and Seamheads

1898 births
1986 deaths
Wilmington Potomacs players
Baseball third basemen
Baseball players from Georgia (U.S. state)
People from Thomasville, Georgia
20th-century African-American sportspeople